South Guildford is a suburb of Perth, Western Australia, located in the City of Swan local government area.

Transport 
South Guildford is served by Transperth bus routes 290 and 291, operating between Redcliffe railway station and Midland railway station. 290 operates in the west along Great Eastern Highway while 291 operates through the residential heart of the suburb. This route offers service all through the week, while route 290 is a faster service which does not operate on Sundays and public holidays. Guildford and East Guildford train stations are actually the closest to this suburb by distance, but there are no direct bus connection to them, although route 290 operates within walking distance of both.

References

Suburbs of Perth, Western Australia
Suburbs and localities in the City of Swan